If These Trees Could Talk is the eponymous debut EP by the American post-rock band If These Trees Could Talk. It was released independently on September 27, 2006. 
NEMeadow Studios in Bath then mastered by John Walsh at Lava Room Recordings in Cleveland.

After being out of print for over ten years, the EP was reissued in 2022 by Metal Blade Records on vinyl, featuring a new album cover and packaging.

Track listing
All songs written, recorded and produced by If These Trees Could Talk.

Personnel
If These Trees Could Talk
 Tom Fihe - bass
 Zack Kelly - drums
 Cody Kelly - guitar
 Jeff Kalal - guitar
 Mike Socrates - guitar
Production
 Zack Kelly - artwork, producer, mixing
 John Walsh - mastering

References

2006 debut EPs
If These Trees Could Talk albums
Self-released EPs